Dowlatabad-e Hajjilu (also Romanized as Dowlatābād-e Ḩājjīlū; also known as Dowlatābād) is a village in Hajjilu Rural District, in the Central District of Kabudarahang County, Hamadan Province, Iran. At the 2006 census, its population was 20, in 6 families.

References 

Populated places in Kabudarahang County